Hegar is a surname. Notable people with the surname include:

Ernst Ludwig Alfred Hegar (1830-1914), German gynecologist
Friedrich Hegar (1841–1927), Swiss composer, conductor and violinist
Glenn Hegar (born 1970), American politician
Mary Jennings Hegar (born c. 1976), American political candidate